The 2006–07 Eastern Counties Football League season was the 65th in the history of Eastern Counties Football League a football competition in England.

Premier Division

The Premier Division featured 19 clubs which competed in the division last season, along with three new clubs:
Cambridge Regional College, new club taking place of Cambridge City reserves
Felixstowe & Walton United, promoted from Division One
Stanway Rovers, promoted from Division One

League table

Division One

Division One featured 19 clubs which competed in the division last season, no new clubs joined the division this season.

League table

References

External links
 Eastern Counties Football League

2006-07
9